Rogletimide, also known as pyridoglutethimide, is a medication which was never marketed. It is related in chemical structure to the sedative/hypnotic drug glutethimide, but instead has pharmacological activity as a selective aromatase inhibitor similar to the related drug aminoglutethimide and has no significant sedative-hypnotic effect. This makes it potentially useful in the treatment of breast cancer, and with fewer side effects than aminoglutethimide, but its lower potency caused it to be unsuccessful in clinical trials.

Synthesis

Base catalyzed alkylation of ethyl 4-pyridylacetate [54401-85-3] (1) with iodoethane gives ethyl 2-(4-pyridyl)butyrate [76766-56-8] (2). Base catalyzed conjugate addition of the carbanion to acrylamide (3) gives (4). The last step is an intramolecular cyclization to rogletimide (5).

References

Abandoned drugs
Aromatase inhibitors
Glutarimides
4-Pyridyl compounds